In the Rainbow Rain is the ninth studio album by American indie band Okkervil River. The album was released on ATO Records on April 27, 2018.

Release
On February 12, 2018, Okkervil River announced the release of their new album for April 27, 2018, alongside the first single "Don't Move Back to L.A.". On March 20, 2018, the second single "Pulled Up The Ribbon" was released, along with a music video. The music video features Sarah Pedinotti. On April 11, 2018, the band released the music video for "Don't Move Back to L.A.". The third single "Famous Tracheotomies" was released on April 16, 2018.

Critical reception
In the Rainbow Rain was met with "generally favorable" reviews from critics. At Metacritic, which assigns a weighted average rating out of 100 to reviews from mainstream publications, this release received an average score of 68, based on 18 reviews. Aggregator Album of the Year gave the release a 66 out of 100 based on a critical consensus of 16 reviews.

Track listing

Personnel
Brittany Anjou - Vibraphone (7), Glockenspiel (3)
Simone Appleby - Backing Vocals (1-3,7,10)
Leslie Gardner - Backing Vocals (1-3,7,10)
Will Graefe - Vocals (3,6-9), Acoustic Guitar (8), Electric Guitar (1-10)
Jeremy Gustin - Percussion (1,7), Congas (1,4,7), Finger Cymbals (9)
Cole Kamen-Green - Vocals (8), Trumpet (2,8,9), Mellophone (2,9)
Chris Kyle - Electric Guitar (1,10)
Benjamin Lazar Davis - Vocals (3,6-9), Bass (1,2,5-10), Piano (9), ARP Synthesizer (3), Moog Synthesizer (3,4), Drum Programming (3)
Frank LoCrasto - Grand Piano (3), Tack Piano (3), Fender Rhodes (4,7,10), Wurlitzer (1,3), ARP Synthesizer (7)
Jonathan Meiburg - Vocals (1-3,6,8)
Rob Moose - Violin (1,10), Viola (1,10)
David Nagler - Roland 2000 Synthesizer (1)
Clinton Newman - Electric Guitar (1)
Phil Palazzolo - Piano (4)
Sarah K. Pedinotti - Vocals (3-10), Piano (4,8), Hammond Organ (7), Wurlitzer (5), Mellotron (5), ARP Synthesizer (8,10), Moog Synthesizer (2,8), Oberheim Synthesizer (2,3,7), Roland Synthesizer (4,9), Waldorf Synthesizer (1,10), RMI Keyboard Computer (1,3,7,10)
Jared Samuel - Piano (2), Hammond Organ (5,6)
Will Sheff - Vocals (1-10), Acoustic Guitar (2-6,9,10), Electric Guitar (5,10), Piano (1,10), Upright Piano (3), Wurlitzer (6), Mellotron (4,5,9,10), Roland Synthesizer (3,5,7,8,10), Drum Programming (1,4,7,8)
Alex Spiegelman - Vocals (8), Saxophone (2,4,8), Clarinet (9), Flute (2,4,9)
Cully Symington - Drums (1-10), Percussion (2,3,5,6,8), Shaker (1)
Saundra Williams - Backing Vocals (1-3,7)

Charts

References

External links
 

Okkervil River albums
2018 albums
ATO Records albums